Santa Caterina d'Alessandria is a small, Baroque-style, Roman Catholic church and convent located on via Cesare Battisti #245 in the city of Padua in the region of Veneto, Italy.

History
A church was present here by the 13th century. Catherine of Alexandria was considered one of the patron saints of the University of Padua. By the 14th century, a student college was founded here. A nobleman of Padua, Jacopo D'Arqua, endowed for construction in 1594. The church was rebuilt in the 17th century in Baroque style, and the college converted into an Augustinian monastery tending to convertite or former fallen women (Magdalene asylum). Severely damaged by an earthquake in 1976, the church was restored by 2016. The main altarpiece in the 19th century depicted the Mystical Marriage of St Catherine by Marcantonio Bonaccorsi. The altar has polychrome marble with columns and a tympanum surmounted by dynamic sculptures, completed by a sculptor of the Bonazza family, as well as Giordano and Damini. The church also had a canvas depicting the Annunciation (1718) by Bartolomeo Moro. The violinist Giuseppe Tartini was buried here in 1770.

See also
Catholic Church in Italy

References

Roman Catholic churches in Padua
Baroque architecture in Veneto
18th-century Roman Catholic church buildings in Italy
Magdalene asylums